Bhongaon Assembly constituency is one of the 403 constituencies of the Uttar Pradesh Legislative Assembly, India. It is a part of the Mainpuri district and one of the four assembly constituencies in the Mainpuri Lok Sabha constituency. First election in this assembly constituency was held in 1957 after the "DPACO (1956)" (delimitation order) was passed in 1956. After the "Delimitation of Parliamentary and Assembly Constituencies Order" was passed in 2008, the constituency was assigned identification number 108.  Since 1956, this constituency has ceased and has been created several times.

Wards  / Areas
Extent of Bhongaon Assembly constituency is KCs Alipur Patti, Bhongaon, Bewar, Bhongaon NP & Bewar NP of Bhongaon Tehsil.

Members of the Legislative Assembly

Election results

2022

2012
16th Vidhan Sabha: 2012 Elections

See also

Mainpuri district
Mainpuri Lok Sabha constituency
Sixteenth Legislative Assembly of Uttar Pradesh
Uttar Pradesh Legislative Assembly
Vidhan Bhawan

References

External links
 

Assembly constituencies of Uttar Pradesh
Mainpuri district
Constituencies established in 1956